Tran To Nga (born March 30, 1942) is a Franco-Vietnamese environmental activist. During the Vietnam War, she was a journalist, then a liaison officer for the National Liberation Front. After the war, she became a school principal before running a travel agency.

Biography
Tran To Nga was born into a wealthy family that favored Vietnamese independence from France. She was educated at the Marie Curie school in Saigon where she learned French. In 1955, at the age of 13, she was sent to Hanoi (Democratic Republic of Vietnam) by her mother, then a resistance fighter, to shelter her in case she was arrested.

Tran To Nga obtained her university degree in Chemistry in 1965, in the midst of the Vietnam War, and she joined the movement of the National Front for the Liberation of South Vietnam the same evening. She traveled on foot for four months, notably on the Ho Chi Minh trail, and joined the maquis in the South. While covering the events as a journalist, Tran To Nga was contaminated by Agent Orange.

In 1966, in the region of Củ Chi (north of Saigon), she saw a "white cloud", a long trail in the wake of an American army C-123, as she wrote in her autobiography, “A sticky rain trickles down my shoulders and smears on my skin. A fit of coughing takes me. […] I am going to wash myself. And then I immediately forget. In the months that followed, she was again the victim of the spraying of Agent Orange that the United States poured by the millions of liters on Vietnam between 1961 and 1970: "As I followed the troops of the National Front for the Liberation of South- Vietnam for the news agency Giai Phong, I walked through the jungle, walked in the swamps, soaking myself in wetlands and polluted soils”. For her activities as a journalist and liaison officer for the FNL, she will be imprisoned and released on April 30, 1975, the day of the liberation of Vietnam.

Her eldest daughter, Viêt Haï, born in 1968 in the maquis, suffers from a heart defect, tetralogy of Fallot. Her daughter died at the age of 17 months. Tran To Nga has two other daughters, one born in 1971 and the other in prison in 1974. They both have heart and bone defects. She herself suffers from breast cancer, type 2 diabetes, alpha-thalassemia, and recurrent tuberculosis, pathologies caused by dioxin. In her biography, she summarizes: “my descendants and I are poisoned. Examination of the famous list of diseases established by the Americans allows us to say that I suffer from 5 of the 17 inventoried pathologies.”

Fighting the Effects of Agent Orange
Tran To Nga testified at the Opinion Tribunal for Vietnamese Agent Orange/Dioxin Victims, which took place in Paris on May 15–16, 2009. The judges hailed from Africa, North and South America, D Asia and Europe, the tribunal was presided over by Judge Jitendra Sharma. The conclusions of this tribunal were given to the President of the Democratic Republic of Vietnam, the President of the United States of America and the Secretary General of the United Nations.

In the spring of 2014, she assigned 26 multinationals in the American agrochemical industry that had manufactured or supplied Agent Orange, including Monsanto and Dow Chemical. The Agent Orange spilled on the lands of South Vietnam, part of Cambodia and Laos, in particular to defoliate the Ho Chi Minh trail, contained dioxin (TCDD), a toxic manufacturing residue. Alongside her are the support committee for Tran To Nga, the Vietnam Dioxine collective, the Stop Monsanto-Bayer collective and agrochemicals, as well as many other political figures and environmental and solidarity associations: the collective zero chlordecone zero poison, MEP Marie Toussaint, jurist Valérie Cabanes, etc.

Following the developments (disappearance, mergers, acquisitions) of these companies, fourteen firms were finally assigned to the trial: Dow Chemical Company, Monsanto Company, Hercules Inc, Uniroyal Chemical Co Inc, Uniroyal Chemical Acquisition Corporation, Uniroyal Inc, Uniroyal Chemical Holding Company, Occidental Chemical Corporation, Maxus Energy Corporation, Tierra Solution Inc, Chemical Land Holdings, Th Agriculture and Nutrition Co, Hacros Chemicals Inc, Pharmacia & Upjohn Incorporated.

The high court of Evry receives the complaint, thanks to a modification of the law which authorizes a French national to bring a legal action for acts committed outside French territory by a foreigner. The civil complaint is filed by lawyers Bertrand Repolt, Amélie Lefebvre and the tenor of the bar William Bourdon. The status hearing of June 29, 2020 set the date for oral arguments in the trial brought by Tran To Nga for October 12, 2020 hearing then postponed to January 25, 2021.

Two op-eds signed by numerous personalities and associations, calling for “justice for Tran To Nga and the victims of Agent Orange”, were published on August 7, 2020 and January 18, 2021. Many associations and political personalities signed a letter of support for Tran To Nga in her lawsuit against American chemical companies, published in June 2021.

The pleadings took place on January 25, 2021, the decision of the court of first instance was rendered on May 10, 2021. The court ruled the request inadmissible, adopting the arguments of the agrochemical companies. Tran To Nga's lawyers appealed against this decision.

Her activism and litigation against American companies is depicted in the documentary film The People vs. Agent Orange.

References

External links
 Official website

Living people
1942 births